The David & Bourgeois was a French automobile manufactured only in 1898.  A tiller-steered saloon, it featured a "square-four" engine developed by Paul Gautier.

References
David Burgess Wise, The New Illustrated Encyclopedia of the Automobile

Vehicles introduced in 1898
1890s cars
Cars introduced in 1898
Defunct motor vehicle manufacturers of France
Veteran vehicles